Ballykinler, often transcribed as Ballykinlar, is a village and civil parish in County Down, Northern Ireland. It lies 12 kilometres south west of Downpatrick, in the parish of Tyrella and Dundrum. In the 2001 Census it had a population of 348 people. It is within the Newry, Mourne and Down area and runs parallel to the Irish Sea coast. Located within the Lecale Coast Area of Outstanding Natural Beauty, the village is surrounded by low drumlins and marshes. It is also the site of a former British Army base known as Abercorn Barracks.

Etymology
At the time of the conquest of Ulster by John de Courcy around 1177, Ballykinlar was called Lesscummalscig. The tithes from the area went to Christ Church, Dublin to pay for wax candles hence it became .

Amenities 
Public houses in the area include the Minerstown Tavern (located 3 miles to the east along the coast) and The Four Roads Inn (2 miles from the village).

The village was selected for an award from the Big Lottery Fund of £128,472 to provide a new children's playgroup area.

Visitors include walkers and hikers who wish to observe the coastline of County Down, and undertake the Ballykinlar to Killough walk which passes the Blue Flag beach at Tyrella. A nearby coastal path is maintained by the Ministry of Defence, although access is prohibited when shooting ranges are active.

Transport 
Ballykinlar Halt railway station was opened in March 1915, but closed on 16 January 1950.

A regular bus service runs between Downpatrick and Ballykinlar, via Clough.

Sport 
Ballykinlar has three sports pitches, including two changing facilities. It also has several association football teams including U13's, U15's, U17's and a second and first team.

Ballykinlar also has a Gaelic Football team called Baile Choinnleora (which is Irish for Ballykinlar), founded in 1932. The club's ground is named Tadhg Barry Memorial Park, in memory of Irish nationalist, trade unionist and journalist Tadhg Barry.

Civil parish 
The civil parish is in the historic barony of Lecale Upper and contains the settlement of Ballykinler.

The civil parish contains the townlands of Ballykinler Lower, Ballykinler Middle, and Ballykinler Upper.

See also 
List of villages in Northern Ireland
List of civil parishes of County Down

References

Bibliography
 Prisoners of War - Ballykinlar Internment Camp 1920-1921, Liam O'Duibhir 2013 
 The Ulster Defence Regiment: An Instrument of Peace?, Chris Ryder 1991

External links 
Drumaroad History
Ballykinler Catholic Church
BFBS radio in Ballykinler on 107.5 fm
 http://www.mercierpress.ie/irish-books/prisoners_of_war_ballykinlar_internment_camp_1920_1921/

Villages in County Down